United States Coast Guard Station Cape Cod Canal is a United States Coast Guard station located in Sandwich, Massachusetts. It operates patrol boats along the coast of Cape Cod, the Cape Cod Canal, and the treacherous waters of Buzzards Bay.

See also
List of military installations in Massachusetts

External links
Welcome to the U.S. Coast Guard First District
 http://wikimapia.org/5726134/US-Coast-Guard-Sation-Cape-Cod-Canal

Buildings and structures in Sandwich, Massachusetts
United States Coast Guard stations
Military installations in Massachusetts
Buildings and structures in Barnstable County, Massachusetts